Jae Andrew Martin (born 5 February 1976) is an English former professional footballer who played as a midfielder. He played in the Football League for Southend United, Leyton Orient, Birmingham City, Lincoln City and Peterborough United, before playing non-league football for a large number of clubs, mostly in the Midlands.

Non-league career

Martin linked up with Barnt Green Spartak making a goalscoring debut in the 3–2 Midland Combination Premier Division clash with Feckenham on 29 October 2005.

In July 2007, Martin joined Stratford Town, making his final appearance for the club in a 2–1 defeat at Alvechurch on 3 November 2007 before moving on to Woodford United. Having scored with a penalty on his home debut for the club in a 3–0 Southern Football League Division One Midlands victory over Berkhamsted Town on 12 November 2007, he was quickly on the move again joining Evesham United and making his debut in a 4–2 Errea Cup home defeat to Gloucester City eight days later. It proved to be his only appearance in his second spell for the club and he moved on to Atherstone Town.

Martin began the season with Sutton Coldfield Town. He joined Coleshill Town, making his debut in the 2–0 Midland Football Alliance victory at Shifnal Town on 24 January 2009.

References

External links

Lincoln City F.C. Official Archive Profile

1976 births
Living people
English footballers
Association football midfielders
Southend United F.C. players
Leyton Orient F.C. players
Birmingham City F.C. players
Lincoln City F.C. players
Peterborough United F.C. players
Grantham Town F.C. players
Welling United F.C. players
Woking F.C. players
Moor Green F.C. players
Bromsgrove Rovers F.C. players
Evesham United F.C. players
Solihull Borough F.C. players
Barnt Green Spartak F.C. players
Stourport Swifts F.C. players
Bedworth United F.C. players
Stratford Town F.C. players
Woodford United F.C. players
Atherstone Town F.C. players
Sutton Coldfield Town F.C. players
Coleshill Town F.C. players
Northfield Town F.C. players
English Football League players